Legislative elections were held in Mexico on 1 July 1979. The Institutional Revolutionary Party won 296 of the 400 seats in the Chamber of Deputies. Voter turnout was 49%.

Results

References

Mexico
Legislative
Legislative elections in Mexico
July 1979 events in Mexico